Piraquara is a municipality in the state of Paraná in the Southern Region of Brazil.

The municipality contains part of the  Serra da Baitaca State Park, created in 2002.

Notable people 

 Charles Emmanuel de Barros Marcondes (1989-) Brazilian actor and voice actor

See also
List of municipalities in Paraná

References

Municipalities in Paraná